Ulupınar is a village in Gülnar district of  Mersin Province, Turkey. At  it is in the Toros Mountains. The population of the village was 327 . According to oral tradition the former name of the village was Katarcalı, referring to a well known family of the village. But the name was  confused with Katırcalı and the villagers renamed the village.

References

Villages in Gülnar District